Shul (also Romanized as Shūl and Shool; also known as Sūl) is a village in Band-e Amir Rural District, Zarqan District, Shiraz County, Fars Province, Iran. At the 2006 census, its population was 2,221, in 478 families.

References 

Populated places in Zarqan County